Citrus is a genus of flowering plants including the orange and lemon.

Citrus may also refer to:

Places in the United States
 Citrus, California, a census-designated place in Los Angeles County
 Kearsarge, California, formerly named Citrus
 Citrus College, a community college located in Glendora, California
 Citrus County, Florida

Other uses
 Citrus (album), a 2006 album by shoegazing band Asobi Seksu
 Citrus Project, a multilingual programming environment
 AirTran Airways (call sign Citrus), a former US airline
 Citrus (manga), a yuri manga by Saburouta
 Citrus (titular see), a titular see of the Roman Catholic Church
 Citrus Leisure, a Sri Lankan hotel chain